Broadcasting Tower is a university building in Broadcasting Place in Woodhouse Lane, Leeds, England. Adjacent to other university buildings, it forms part of Leeds Beckett University; it houses the Faculty of Arts, Environment and Technology, while the main tower section consists of student flats.  It was designed by Stirling Prize-winning architects Feilden Clegg Bradley. It is clad in COR-TEN weathering steel, which has given it the rust-like appearance it is known for.

The owners, Unite, are one of the UK's largest operators of purpose-built student accommodation. They provide accommodation for over 46,000 students in 133 properties across 28 of the UK's university cities. From September 2016 the accommodation space within Broadcasting Tower will be solely for Leeds Beckett University students.

In June 2010, Broadcasting Place was the recipient of the 2010 Best Tall Building in the World award by the Council on Tall Buildings and Urban Habitat.

References

External links
 Broadcasting Tower website
 Downing Developments - Liverpool
 The Broadcasting Tower - Downing Information Page
 Feilden Clegg Bradley Studios website

Halls of residence in the United Kingdom
Residential buildings completed in 2009
Buildings and structures in Leeds
Weathering steel
1986 establishments in England
Leeds Beckett University